The North American Chinese Invitational Volleyball Tournament (N.A.C.I.V.T.) is held every Labor Day weekend and features men's nine-man (9-man) and women's 6's volleyball teams. The tournament is generally held outdoors and played on pavement, with the courts typically set-up in a large parking lot or even on the streets.  Due to changes in weather the tournament can also be held indoors (e.g., convention centers).  It is very much a cultural phenomenon; two-thirds of the players on each team must be 100% Chinese, and the rest must be of Asian descent (Asian: origins from: Myanmar (formerly Burma), Cambodia, China, Hong Kong, Indonesia, Japan, Korea, Laos, Malaysia, Mongolia, Philippines, Singapore, Taiwan, Thailand and Vietnam).  The inaugural tournament was held in Boston in 1944.  There are teams from Boston, Calgary, Maryland, Los Angeles, Chicago, North Carolina, Houston, Montreal, New York City, New Jersey, Ottawa, Philadelphia, San Francisco, Houston, San Diego, Toronto, Vancouver and Washington, D.C.

Each year there are also mini tournaments held in Toronto, Boston, New York City, Philadelphia, Washington, D.C./Maryland and San Francisco leading up to the annual NACIVT.

The men's 9-man portion of the NACIVT is the subject of a documentary called 9-Man  that was completed in 2014 and had its world premiere at IFFBoston on April 27, 2014.

Champions

Men's NACIVT Champions

Women's NACIVT Champions

See also
 9-man
 Nine-man Volleyball

References

External links 
 Official NACIVT Portal (archived copy)
 Official site of New York MINI aka 'Beast of the East' or East Coast Championship
 2016 72nd NACIVT Los Angeles
 2014 70th NACIVT Las Vegas (Hosted by San Francisco)
 2013 69th NACIVT Washington D.C.
 2012 68th NACIVT Toronto
 2011 67th NACIVT Montreal
 2010 66th NACIVT Boston

Video links 
 9-Man documentary
 2007-63rd NACIVT Classics presented by the 63rd NACIVT San Francisco
 2006-62nd NACIVT presented by the 62nd NACIVT Washington D.C.
 2001-57th NACIVT FINALS Toronto Connex A vs. Washington D.C Hip Sing/MVP Six Pak A in Washington D.C.
 1987-43rd NACIVT Montreal Hung Ying A vs. New York Vikings Gold Game 1 in Boston
 1987-43rd NACIVT Montreal Hung Ying A vs. New York Vikings Gold Game 2 in Boston
 1987-43rd NACIVT Montreal Hung Ying A vs. San Francisco Mei Mei Game 1 in Boston
 1987-43rd NACIVT Montreal Hung Ying A vs. San Francisco Mei Mei Game 2 in Boston
 1987-43rd NACIVT FINALS Montreal Hung Ying A vs. Toronto Ngun Lam Game 1 in Boston
 1987-43rd NACIVT FINALS Montreal Hung Ying A vs. Toronto Ngun Lam Game 2 in Boston
 1987-43rd NACIVT FINALS Montreal Hung Ying A vs. Toronto Ngun Lam Game 3 in Boston
 1987-43rd NACIVT FINALS Montreal Hung Ying A vs. Toronto Ngun Lam Game 4 in Boston
 1987-43rd NACIVT FINALS Montreal Hung Ying A vs. Toronto Ngun Lam Game 5 in Boston
 1982-38th NACIVT FINALS SF Chung Sing Vs Toronto Flying Tigers Game 1 in Toronto
 1982-38th NACIVT FINALS SF Chung Sing Vs Toronto Flying Tigers Game 2 in Toronto
 1982-38th NACIVT FINALS SF Chung Sing Vs Toronto Flying Tigers Game 3 in Toronto
 1982-38th NACIVT FINALS SF Chung Sing Vs Toronto Flying Tigers Game 4 in Toronto
 1982-38th NACIVT FINALS SF Chung Sing Vs Toronto Flying Tigers Game 5 in Toronto

Volleyball competitions in the United States